Bitter Creek is a stream in the U.S. state of South Dakota.

Bitter Creek most likely received its name on account of the bitter taste of the water it contains.

See also
List of rivers of South Dakota

References

Rivers of Pennington County, South Dakota
Rivers of South Dakota